George Graham Johnston (April 15, 1882 – May 29, 1960) was a politician in Ontario, Canada. He was a Progressive Conservative member of the Legislative Assembly of Ontario from 1943 to 1960 who represented the riding of Simcoe Centre.

Background
Johnston was born in Minesing, Ontario, he was a manufacturer. Johnston died in office in 1960 from a heart attack.

Politics
Johnston ran as the Progressive Conservative candidate in the 1943 Ontario general election. He defeated Liberal O.E. Todd by 523 votes. He was re-elected five times before his death in 1960.

References

External links

1882 births
1960 deaths
Progressive Conservative Party of Ontario MPPs